Gheorghe Urschi (born 18 January 1948 in Cotiujenii Mari) is a Moldovan actor, director and humorist. He is active more than 40 years. In 2012 he was awarded the title of Artist of the people by Nicolae Timofti.

References

1948 births
Living people
Moldovan male actors
Romanian people of Moldovan descent